Red Necktie is a 1948 Soviet film directed by Mariya Sauts and Vladimir Sukhobokov.

Plot 
The film tells about a young man, Shura Badekine, whose father died as a result of the war and now Shura lives in the family of the director of the Vishnyak plant. The children of Vishnyak study well at school and have wonderful relations with each other, but one of them, Valery, shows selfishness and arrogance and once ceases to wear a pioneer tie. Shura Badekin condemned Valery's act on the council of the detachment, and Valery in turn, called Shura a traitor.

Starring 
 Aleksandr Khvylya as Vishnyakov (as A.Khvylya)
 Galina Stepanova as Nadezhda Ivanovna (as G. Stepanova)
 Vera Okuneva as Grandmother (as V. Okuneva)
 Vitali Doronin as Kochubei (as V. Doronin)
 Nikolay Bogatyryov as Young Pioneer organizer (as N. Bogatyryov)
  as Valeri Vishnyakov (as Shura Sokolov)
 Irina Nachinkina as Marina Vishnyakova (as Ira Nachinkina)
 Vyacheslav Kotov as Shura Badeikin (as Slava Kotov)
 Anatoli Gonichev as Chashkin (as Tolya Ganichev)

References

External links 
 

1948 films
1940s Russian-language films
Soviet black-and-white films